Shija Academy of Health Sciences is a private medical college located in Langol, Imphal West, Manipur. It has total 150 Bachelor of Medicine, Bachelor of Surgery (MBBS) seats. It is the first homegrown private medical college in North East India.

References

External links 

Medical colleges in Manipur
Education in Imphal
Educational institutions established in 2021